Mert Erdoğan (born 1 March 1989) is a Turkish footballer. He currently plays for Tavşanlı Linyitspor in Turkey.

References

External links

1989 births
Living people
Turkish footballers
Turkey under-21 international footballers
Turkey youth international footballers
MKE Ankaragücü footballers
Süper Lig players
TFF First League players
Association football midfielders